Heather and Ibstock railway station is a disused railway station on the former Ashby and Nuneaton Joint Railway. It served the village of Heather and town of Ibstock. It was originally named Heather, but with the industrial expansion of nearby Ibstock the request to have it renamed to include that town was accepted in 1894. It closed to passengers in 1931 but closed to parcel traffic in 1951. Goods continued to pass through until 1954 when the line was closed from Hugglescote to Shackerstone. The site has since been demolished and is now part of a housing estate which now occupies the entire former station site.

References

http://www.shackerstonefestival.co.uk/ANJR/Hheather_and_ibstock.htm
https://www.geograph.org.uk/photo/3627882

Disused railway stations in Leicestershire
Former Midland Railway stations
Former London and North Western Railway stations
Railway stations in Great Britain opened in 1873
Railway stations in Great Britain closed in 1931